Big Towne, 2061 is the second and final studio album by the power trio group Paris, who disbanded not long after its release. The album reached number 152 on the Billboard pop album chart.

Drummer Thom Mooney left the band shortly after recording the eponymous first album, so drums on this album were played by Hunt Sales, who had previously been with Todd Rundgren's band Utopia.

Guitarist/vocalist Bob Welch had written most of the songs for a projected third Paris album, when Sales fell ill, and the group disbanded before recording started. Welch used these songs on his solo album French Kiss.

Re-release
The album was re-released on CD, on the Zoom Club label, in 2001 and again in 2004. The CD re-release did not include any additional, re-mixed or other bonus tracks.

In 2013, Capitol Records/USM Japan/Universal Music remastered and reissued a paper-sleeve album replica (Mini LP) SHM-CD version of Big Towne, 2061 (TYCP-80037).

Track listing

Personnel
Paris
 Bob Welch – vocals, guitar
 Glenn Cornick – bass guitar, keyboards
 Hunt Sales – vocals, drums, percussion

Additional personnel
 Bob Hughes – production, engineering
 Steve Pouliot and Meyrick Smith – assistant engineering

References

1976 albums
Capitol Records albums